Thiago Rangel Cionek (born 21 April 1986) is a professional footballer who plays as a centre-back for Serie B club Reggina. Born in Brazil, he represented the Poland national team.

Club career

Born in Curitiba, Paraná, Cionek began his career with local Cuiabá Esporte Clube. He moved to Europe for a brief spell at Portugal's GD Bragança before returning to Brazil with Clube de Regatas Brasil.

In 2008, Cionek went back to Europe, playing four seasons with Jagiellonia Białystok in his ancestral Poland. The team won the 2009–10 Polish Cup and the 2010 Polish SuperCup.

He then had a year in the Italian Serie B with Padova Calcio, before signing for another club from the same division, Modena FC on 2 September 2013. On 11 January 2016, he joined his third Italian club, US Città di Palermo of Serie A. Two years later, with his contract due to expire at the end of the season, he was sold to SPAL of the same league on a 2-year contract. 

On 28 September 2020, he signed a three-year contract with Serie B club Reggina.

International career
While having been born and raised in Curitiba, Brazil, Cionek's family is of Polish descent and he therefore applied for Polish citizenship, which he received in October 2011. Cionek made his international debut for the Poland national team on 13 May 2014, starting in a goalless friendly draw against Germany in Hamburg. Cionek then was called up by Poland's national team to play in the 2016 European Championship in France.

In May 2018 he was named in Poland's preliminary 35-man squad for the 2018 FIFA World Cup in Russia. On 19 June in Poland's initial World Cup match against Senegal, Cionek scored an own goal that opened a 2–1 loss.

Career statistics

Club

International

Honours
Jagiellonia Białystok
Polish Cup: 2010
Polish SuperCup: 2010

References

External links

1986 births
Living people
UEFA Euro 2016 players
2018 FIFA World Cup players
Polish footballers
Brazilian footballers
Footballers from Curitiba
Citizens of Poland through descent
Polish people of Brazilian descent
Brazilian people of Polish descent
Poland international footballers
Association football central defenders
Association football utility players
Cuiabá Esporte Clube players
GD Bragança players
Clube de Regatas Brasil players
Jagiellonia Białystok players
Calcio Padova players
Modena F.C. players
Palermo F.C. players
S.P.A.L. players
Reggina 1914 players
Campeonato Brasileiro Série B players
Segunda Divisão players
Ekstraklasa players
Serie B players
Serie A players
Expatriate footballers in Portugal
Expatriate footballers in Italy
Polish expatriate footballers
Polish expatriate sportspeople in Portugal
Polish expatriate sportspeople in Italy
Brazilian expatriate footballers
Brazilian expatriate sportspeople in Portugal
Brazilian expatriate sportspeople in Italy